Kürdəmiş (also, Kyurdamish) is a village and municipality in the Goychay Rayon of Azerbaijan.  It has a population of 1,275. The municipality consists of the villages of Kürdəmiş and Türkmən.

References 

Populated places in Goychay District